National Geographic Dinosaurs is a nonfiction reference book on dinosaurs, written by Paul Barrett, with illustrations by Raúl Martín, and an introduction by Kevin Padian. It was published in 2001 by National Geographic.

Animals featured

Dinosaurs
 Achelousaurus
 Albertosaurus
 Allosaurus
 Altispinax (mentioned)
 Anchisaurus (briefly identified by its synonym Ammosaurus)
 Ankylosaurus
 Apatosaurus
 Aragosaurus
 Archaeopteryx
 Argentinosaurus (mentioned)
 Atlascopcosaurus
 Baptornis
 Baryonyx
 Beipiaosaurus (mentioned)
 Brachiosaurus
 Camarasaurus
 Camptosaurus
 Carcharodontosaurus
 Carnotaurus
 Caudipteryx
 Centrosaurus
 Ceratosaurus
 Cetiosaurus (mentioned)
 Chasmosaurus
 Coelophysis
 Compsognathus
 Concornis (mentioned)
 Corythosaurus
 Deinocheirus (unidentified)
 Deinonychus
 Dilophosaurus
 Diplodocus carnegii
 Diplodocus hallorum (mentioned, identified as its synonym Seismosaurus)
 Dromaeosaurus
 Dryosaurus
 Edmontonia
 Edmontosaurus
 Einiosaurus
 Eoalulavis (mentioned)
 Eoraptor
 Erlikosaurus (mentioned)
 Euoplocephalus
 Gallimimus
 Giganotosaurus (mentioned)
 Giraffatitan (identified as its synonym Brachiosaurus brancai)
 Herrerasaurus
 Hesperornis (mentioned)
 Hylaeosaurus
 Hypsilophodon
 Iberomesornis
 Iguanodon
 Kentrosaurus
 Lambeosaurus
 Leptoceratops
 Lesothosaurus
 Lusotitan (identified by its synonym Brachiosaurus atalaiensis)
 Magnosaurus (mentioned)
 Maiasaura
 Megalosaurus (mentioned)
 Monoclonius
 Mussaurus (mentioned)
 Omeisaurus (mentioned)
 Ornithomimus
 Ouranosaurus
 Oviraptor
 Pachycephalosaurus
 Pachyrhinosaurus
 Parasaurolophus
 Patagosaurus
 Pelecanimimus
 Pentaceratops (mentioned)
 Piatnitzkysaurus
 Plateosaurus
 Protarchaeopteryx (mentioned)
 Protoceratops
 Psittacosaurus
 Rebbachisaurus (mentioned)
 Saltasaurus
 Saurornitholestes
 Scelidosaurus
 Scutellosaurus (mentioned)
 Segnosaurus (mentioned)
 Sinornithosaurus (mentioned)
 Sinosauropteryx
 Spinosaurus (mentioned)
 Stegosaurus
 Struthiomimus
 Styracosaurus
 Tarbosaurus (mentioned)
 Tenontosaurus
 Thecodontosaurus (mentioned)
 Therizinosaurus
 Triceratops
 Troodon
 Tyrannosaurus
 Velociraptor

Non-dinosaurs
 Bernissartia
 Eudibamus (mentioned)
 Lagerpeton (mentioned)
 Lagosuchus
 Lepidotes
 Liopleurodon (mentioned)
 Marasuchus (mentioned)
 Morganucodon (mentioned)
 Nautilus
 Quetzalcoatlus

2001 non-fiction books
Dinosaur books
National Geographic Society books